(b. November 3, 1978, in Rittō, Shiga) is a Japanese trainer and ex-jockey. He is the younger brother of Yutaka Take.

Take debuted as a jockey in March 1, 1997 at the Hanshin Racecourse. The following day, he won his first race and also his first graded race at the same time, with him winning the Yomiuri Milers Cup while riding Osumi Tycoon, making him the fastest rookie to win a graded race.

He won his first Grade 1 race in 2000 when he won the Shuka Sho with Tico Tico Tac, but failed to win another Grade 1 race until his victory at the Kikuka Sho with Song of Wind, and wouldn't for another 7 when he won 3 Grade 1 races with Meisho Mambo.

He gained his trainer license in December of 2016, and as JRA rules do not allow jockeys to be trainers at the same time, he retired as a jockey in February of 2017. He worked under Kazuo Fujisawa for a year before opening his own stable at Ritto Training Center as a professional trainer in 2018.

He won his first race as a trainer on March 3, 2018; with his brother Yutaka riding Gouin at a maiden race.

Major wins
 Japan
 Kikuka Sho - (1) - Song of Wind (2006)
 NHK Mile Cup - (1) - Win Kluger (2003)
 Queen Elizabeth II Cup - (1) - Meisho Mambo (2013)
 Shuka Sho - (2 ) - Tico Tico Tac (2000), Meisho Mambo (2013)
 Yushun Himba - (1) - Meisho Mambo (2013)

References

External links
 Jockey Koshiro Take - Records - Statistics - Horses | Racing Post

Japanese jockeys
1978 births
Living people
People from Shiga Prefecture

Horse trainers